This is a list of dishes found in Vietnamese cuisine.

Noodle dishes

Dumplings

Pancakes and sandwiches

Rolls and rice papers

Rice

Xôi

Soups and cháo (congees)

Other dishes

Sweet cakes and desserts

Condiments and sauces

Beverages

See also

 Vietnamese cuisine
 List of Vietnamese culinary specialities
 List of Vietnamese ingredients

References

External links

 
 Vietnam recipes

 
Dishes
Vietnamese